The National Wallace Monument (generally known as the Wallace Monument) is a 67 metre tower on the shoulder of the Abbey Craig, a hilltop overlooking Stirling in Scotland. It commemorates Sir William Wallace, a 13th- and 14th-century Scottish hero.

The tower is open to the public for an admission fee. Visitors approach by foot from the base of the crag on which it stands. On entry there are 246 steps to the final observation platform, with three exhibition rooms within the body of the tower. The tower is not accessible to disabled visitors.

Background
The tower was constructed following a fundraising campaign, which accompanied a resurgence of Scottish national identity in the 19th century. The campaign was begun in Glasgow in 1851 by Rev Charles Rogers who was joined by William Burns. Burns took sole charge from around 1855 following Rogers' resignation.

In addition to public subscription, it was partially funded by contributions from a number of foreign donors, including Italian national leader Giuseppe Garibaldi. The foundation stone was laid in 1861 by the Duke of Atholl in his role as Grand Master Mason of Scotland, with a short speech given by Sir Archibald Alison.

It was completed in 1869 to the designs of architect John Thomas Rochead at a cost of £18,000, the monument is a  sandstone tower, built in the Victorian Gothic style.

The tower stands on the Abbey Craig, a volcanic crag above Cambuskenneth Abbey, from which Wallace was said to have watched the gathering of the army of King Edward I of England just before the Battle of Stirling Bridge in 1297. The monument is open to the general public. Visitors climb the 246-step spiral staircase to the viewing gallery inside the monument's crown, which provides expansive views of the Ochil Hills and the Forth Valley.

A number of artifacts believed to have belonged to Wallace are on display inside the monument, including the Wallace Sword, a  longsword weighing almost . Inside is also a Hall of Heroes, a series of busts of famous Scots, effectively a small national Hall of Fame. The heroes are Robert the Bruce, George Buchanan, John Knox, Allan Ramsay, Robert Burns, Robert Tannahill, Adam Smith, James Watt, Sir Walter Scott, William Murdoch, Sir David Brewster, Thomas Carlyle, Hugh Miller, Thomas Chalmers, David Livingstone, and W. E. Gladstone. In 2017 it was announced that Mary Slessor and Maggie Keswick Jencks would be the first heroines to be celebrated in the hall.

Statue of Wallace
The original Victorian statue of Wallace stands on the corner of the monument and is by the Edinburgh sculptor David Watson Stevenson.

Braveheart statue

In 1996 Tom Church carved a statue of Wallace called "Freedom", which was inspired by the film Braveheart. It has the face of Mel Gibson, the actor who played William Wallace in the film. Church leased the statue to Stirling Council, who in 1997 installed it in the car park of the visitor centre at the foot of the craig. The statue was deeply unpopular, being described as "among the most loathed pieces of public art in Scotland".
and was regularly vandalised before being placed in a cage to prevent further damage. Plans to expand the visitor centre, including a new restaurant and reception, led to the unpopular statue's removal in 2008. It was returned to Church, who, after an unsuccessful attempt to sell it at auction, reportedly offered it to Donald Trump's Menie estate golf resort. However, it remained in the garden of the sculptor's home, where it was incorporated into a replica of a castle, and with additions to it that included the head of the decapitated governor of York. In April 2016, it was reported in local press that the statue might be moved to Ardrossan's old Barony Church. In September 2021, it was moved to Glebe Park stadium in Brechin.

See also
Statue of William Wallace, Aberdeen
Wallace's Monument, Ayrshire
Statue of William Wallace, Bemersyde
Wallace's Monument at Elderslie
National Monument of Scotland

References

External links

In Stirling's page on the monument
About the Wallace Monument Embroidery on display in the Keeper’s Lodge

Towers completed in 1869
Category A listed buildings in Stirling (council area)
Scottish military memorials and cemeteries
Museums in Stirling (council area)
Biographical museums in Scotland
History museums in Scotland
William Wallace
1869 establishments in Scotland
National monuments and memorials
Listed monuments and memorials in Scotland
Observation towers in the United Kingdom
Tourist attractions in Scotland
Tourist attractions in Stirling (council area)